was a town located in Katō District, Hyōgo Prefecture, Japan.

As of 2003, the town has an estimated population of 7,263 and a density of 144.34 persons per km². The total area is 50.32 km².

On March 20, 2006, Tōjō, along with the towns of Takino and Yashiro (all from Katō District), was merged to create the city of Katō.

External links
Tojo official website in Japanese (some English content)

Dissolved municipalities of Hyōgo Prefecture
Katō, Hyōgo